Topper is a nickname. Notable people with the nickname include:

Topper Clemons (born 1963), American football player
Topper Headon (born 1955), English rock drummer for The Clash
Topper Rigney (1897–1972), American baseball player
Jerry Toppazzini (1931–2012), Canadian hockey player

Lists of people by nickname